Merit Cup is a yacht. She finished second in the 1997–98 Whitbread Round the World Race skippered by Grant Dalton.

Career
Merit Cup was designed by Bruce Farr and built by Martin Marine.

References

Volvo Ocean Race yachts
Sailing yachts of Monaco
Volvo Ocean 60 yachts
Sydney to Hobart Yacht Race yachts
1990s sailing yachts